Murielle Bochud is a Swiss physician who is the co-chief of the Department of Epidemiology and Health Systems at the Unisanté in Lausanne. Her research considers the epidemiology of cardio-metabolic diseases and genetic epidemiology.

Early life and education 
Bochud attended the College Du Sud, a high school in Switzerland. She completed her training in medicine in 1994. After earning her medical degree, Bochud joined Médecins Sans Frontières, and completed humanitarian missions in Burundi and Tanzania. She eventually returned to Switzerland, where she worked as a hospital doctor in Solothurn. She worked toward a doctoral degree in medicine at the University of Lausanne, and earned a PhD at Case University.

Research and career 
In 1997, Bochud was appointed to the clinical team at the Lausanne University Hospital. She was eventually made Deputy Director of the University of Lausanne Institute of Social and Preventive Medicine in 2017. In 2019, she helped to construct the Department of Epidemiology and Health Systems, where she was made Co-Chief in August 2022. She is concerned about the relationship between carviovascular disease, diabetes and spending too much time in front of a television screen.

During the pandemic, Bochud provided public health advice on how to avoid COVID-19.

Selected publications

References

Living people
Case Western Reserve University alumni
University of Lausanne alumni
Swiss physicians
Swiss women physicians
Year of birth missing (living people)